The Central District of Malayer County is a district (bakhsh) in Malayer County, Hamadan Province, Iran. At the 2006 census, its population was 186,497, in 49,318 families.  The District has one city: Malayer.  The District has four rural districts (dehestan): Haram Rud-e Olya Rural District, Jowzan Rural District, Kuh Sardeh Rural District, and Muzaran Rural District.

References 

Malayer County
Districts of Hamadan Province